Canadian Subject Headings (CSH) is a list of subject headings in the English language, using controlled vocabulary, to access and express the topic content of documents on Canada and Canadian topics. Library and Archives Canada publishes and maintains CSH on the Web. Prior to the merger of the National Library of Canada and the National Archives of Canada, the National Library of Canada published a print version of CSH.

Université Laval also publishes Répertoire de vedettes-matière (RVM), a list intended to provide access to Canadian subject headings in the French language.

See also
 Faceted Application of Subject Terminology (FAST), a simplified syntax of LCSH
 Library of Congress Subject Headings (LCSH)
 Subject Headings Authority File (SWD)
 
 Répertoire de vedettes-matière de l'Université Laval (RVM)

Footnotes

General references
 Canadian Subject Headings 
 Répertoire de vedettes-matière 

Library cataloging and classification
Subject Headings